Belmont Township is one of twenty-six townships in Iroquois County, Illinois, United States. As of the 2010 census, its population was 2,610 and it contained 1,188 housing units.

Geography

Cities, towns, villages
 Watseka (south half)
 Woodland

Unincorporated towns
 Coaler at 
 Woodland Junction at 
(This list is based on USGS data and may include former settlements.)

Cemeteries
The township contains these four cemeteries: Belmont, Body, Iroquois Memorial Park and Keen.

Major highways
  Illinois Route 1

Airports and landing strips
 Newman Landing Strip

Landmarks
 Legion Park

Demographics

School districts
 Iroquois County Community Unit School District 9

Political districts
 Illinois's 15th congressional district
 State House District 105
 State Senate District 53

References
 
 United States Census Bureau 2007 TIGER/Line Shapefiles
 United States National Atlas

External links
 City-Data.com
 Illinois State Archives

Townships in Iroquois County, Illinois
Townships in Illinois